Major Udomporn Polsak (born October 6, 1981) is a Thai weightlifter.

Udomporn Polsak was born in Nakhon Ratchasima. She graduated from the Bangkok College of Physical Education. She won a silver medal in combined lifts at the 2002 Asian Games, bronze at the 2002 World Championships, and gold at the 2003 Southeast Asian Games.

At the 2003 World Weightlifting Championships in Vancouver, British Columbia, Canada, she won a gold medal, with 100 kg in the snatch and a 222.5 kg total.

She was named 2003 Thai Athlete of the Year by the Sports Authority of Thailand.

At the 2004 Summer Olympics in Athens she became the first Thai woman to win an Olympic gold medal, with 97.5 kg snatching and 222.5 kg total.

She was given the honor to be the torch lighter at the 2007 Southeast Asian Games, held in her country.

Notes and references

1981 births
Living people
Udomporn Polsak

Udomporn Polsak
Udomporn Polsak
Weightlifters at the 2004 Summer Olympics
Olympic medalists in weightlifting
Asian Games medalists in weightlifting
Weightlifters at the 1998 Asian Games
Weightlifters at the 2002 Asian Games
Medalists at the 2004 Summer Olympics
Udomporn Polsak
Udomporn Polsak
Medalists at the 2002 Asian Games
Udomporn Polsak
Udomporn Polsak
Southeast Asian Games medalists in weightlifting
Udomporn Polsak
Udomporn Polsak
Competitors at the 2003 Southeast Asian Games
World Weightlifting Championships medalists
Udomporn Polsak
Udomporn Polsak